North York is a former township and city and is now one of the six administrative districts of Toronto, Ontario, Canada. It is located directly north of York, Old Toronto and East York, between Etobicoke to the west and Scarborough to the east. As of the 2016 Census, the district has a population of 869,401.

North York was created as a township in 1922 out of the northern part of the former township of York, a municipality that was located along the western border of Old Toronto. Following its inclusion in Metropolitan Toronto in 1953, it was one of the fastest-growing parts of the region due to its proximity to Old Toronto.  It was declared a borough in 1967, and later became a city in 1979, attracting high-density residences, rapid transit, and a number of corporate headquarters in North York City Centre, its central business district. In 1998, North York was dissolved as part of the amalgamation which created the new city of Toronto. It has since been a secondary economic hub of the city outside Downtown Toronto.

History 

The  was formed on June 13, 1922 out of the rural part of the Township of York. In the previous decade, the southern part of York, bordering the Old City of Toronto had become increasingly urbanized while the northern portion remained rural farmland. The northern residents increasingly resented that they made up 20% of York's tax base while receiving few services and little representation in return, particularly after 1920 when their sole member on York's council, which was elected on an at-large basis, was defeated. Dairy farmer Robert Franklin Hicks organized with other farmers to petition the Ontario legislature to carve out what was then the portion of York Township north of Eglinton Avenue to create the separate township of North York. With the support of the pro-farmer United Farmers of Ontario government, a plebiscite was organized and held and the 6,000 residents voted in favour of separating from York by margin of 393 votes.

The township remained largely rural and agrarian until World War II. After the war, in the late 1940s and 1950s, a housing shortage led to the township becoming increasingly developed as a suburb of Toronto and a population boom. In 1953, the province federated 11 townships and villages with the Old City of Toronto, to become Metropolitan Toronto.

To commemorate receiving its city charter on Valentine's Day, the city's corporate slogan was "The City with Heart". It now forms the largest part of the area served by the "North York Community Council", a committee of Toronto City Council.

North York used to be known as a regional agricultural hub composed of scattered villages. The area boomed following World War II, and by the 1950s and 1960s, it resembled many other sprawling North American suburbs.

On August 10, 2008, the Toronto propane explosion occurred at the Sunrise Propane Industrial Gases propane facility just southwest of the Downsview Airport. This destroyed the depot and damaged several homes nearby. About 13,000 residents were evacuated for several days before being allowed back home. One employee at the company was killed in the blast and one firefighter died while attending to the scene of the accident. A follow-up investigation to the incident made several recommendations concerning propane supply depots. It asked for a review of setback distances between depots and nearby residential areas but didn't call for restrictions on where they can be located.

Canada's deadliest pedestrian attack occurred in the North York City Centre district on April 23, 2018 when a van collided with numerous pedestrians killing 10 and injuring 16 others on Yonge Street between Finch and Sheppard Avenues.

Climate

Neighbourhoods

Demographics 

North York is highly multicultural and diverse.

Economy 

The district's central business district is known as North York Centre, which was the location of the former city's government and major corporate headquarters. North York Centre continues to be one of Toronto's major corporate areas with many office buildings and businesses. The former city hall of North York, the North York Civic Centre, is located within North York City Centre.

Downsview Airport, near Sheppard and Allen Road, employs 1,800 workers. Downsview Airport will be the location of the Centennial College Aerospace campus, a $60 million investment from the Government of Ontario and Government of Canada. Private partners include Bombardier, Honeywell, MDA Corporation, Pratt & Whitney Canada, Ryerson University, Sumitomo Precision Products Canada Aircraft, Inc. and UTC Aerospace Systems.

Flemingdon Park, located near Eglinton and Don Mills, is an economic hub located near the busy Don Valley Parkway and busy Toronto Transit Commission (TTC) routes. McDonald's Canada and Celestica are located in this area, and Foresters Insurance has a major office tower and Bell Canada has a data centre. The Concorde Corporate Centre has  of leasable area and is 85% occupied with tenants such as Home Depot Canada, Sport Alliance of Ontario, Toronto-Dominion Bank, Esri Canada and Deloitte.  Home Depot's Canadian head office is located in Flemingdon Park.

North York houses two of Toronto's five major shopping malls: the Yorkdale Shopping Centre and Fairview Mall. Other neighbourhood malls locations include Centerpoint Mall, Bayview Village, Sheridan Mall, Yorkgate Mall, Shops at Don Mills, Steeles West Market Mall, Jane Finch Mall and Sheppard Centre.

Health care is another major industry in North York, with the district housing several major hospitals, including the North York General Hospital, Humber River Hospital and the Sunnybrook Health Sciences Centre.

Education

Prior to 1998, the North York Board of Education and Conseil des écoles françaises de la communauté urbaine de Toronto operated English and French public secular schools in North York, while the Metropolitan Separate School Board operated English and French public separate schools for North York pupils. Today, four public school boards operate primary and secondary institutions in the former city:

 Conseil scolaire catholique MonAvenir (CSCM)
 Conseil scolaire Viamonde (CSV)
 Toronto Catholic District School Board (TCDSB)
 Toronto District School Board (TDSB) 

CSV and TDSB operate as secular public school boards, the former operating French first language institution, whereas the latter operated English first language institutions. The other two school boards, CSCM and TCDSB, operate as public separate school boards, the former operating French first language separate schools, the latter operating English first language separate schools. All four public school boards are headquartered within North York.
 
In addition to primary and secondary schools, several post-secondary institutions were established in North York. York University is a university that was established in 1959. The university operates two campuses in North York, the Keele campus located in the north, and Glendon College, a bilingual campus operated by the university. There are also two colleges that operate campuses in North York. Seneca College was established in North York in 1967, and presently operates several campuses throughout North York, and Greater Toronto. One of Centennial College's campuses are also located in North York, known as the Downsview Park Aerospace Campus.

Governance
North York is a district of the City of Toronto, and is represented by councillors elected to the Toronto City Council, members elected to the Legislative Assembly of Ontario, as well as members elected to the Parliament of Canada. North York Civic Centre is presently used by North York's community council and other city departments servicing North York.

Prior to North York's amalgamation with Toronto in 1998, North York operated as a lower-tier municipality within the regional municipality of Metropolitan Toronto. The municipality operated its own municipal council, the North York City Council, and met at the North York Civic Centre prior to the municipality's dissolution. The following is a list of reeves (1922–1966) and mayors (1967–1997) of North York.

Reeves and mayors

 1922–1929 Robert Franklin Hicks - born in 1866, Hicks was a dairy farmer who organized with other farmers to petition the Ontario legislature to carve out what was then the portion of York Township north of Eglinton Avenue to create the separate township of North York. During his period as the first reeve, the North York Hydro Commission, a public health board, and a water supply system were created and improvements were made to Yonge Street and other local roads. Hicks died in 1942.
 1929–1930 James Muirhead - farmer in Leslie and Lawrence Ave area. Born in 1859 and lived on the same farm all of his life up to 1929 except for four years. Was chairman of the committee responsible for breaking North York away from York Township and a founding members of the township council.
 1931–1933 George B. Elliott - also served as warden of York county in 1933. As reeve, faced demands for improved unemployment relief as the Depression worsened. Appointed inspector of hospital accounts for indigent patients in York county in 1934. Announced he would run for the federal Conservatives in a York North in 1934 but withdrew his name from consideration.
 1934–1940 Robert Earl Bales - great-grandson of area pioneer John Bales, Earl Bales was North York's youngest reeve at 37. Earl Bales Park, which is on his family's former farmland, is named after him. Like many municipalities, North York was bankrupted by the cost of paying unemployment relied during the Great Depression. Under Bales' leadership, North York was one of the few bankrupted municipalities to be able to pay off its debt. Unlike many other Ontario municipalities, North York never seized any homes or farms for non-payment of taxes. Bales later sat on the North York planning board from 1947 until 1968.
 1941–1949 George Herbert Mitchell also served in the Ontario legislature as CCF MPP for York North from 1943 to 1945, while serving as reeve. As reeve, kept track of expectant mothers come snowfall to ensure that the township's two snowplows kept open the sideroads around their homes. Mitchell was the last reeve to be elected by a predominantly rural electorate.
 1950–1952 Nelson A. Boylen - reporter for The Evening Telegram (1912-1918)  then in the dairy industry for 50 years. Served as a school trustee and then deputy reeve. Opposed the amalgamation of North York into Metropolitan Toronto, arguing that water shortages  could be solved by creating a provincial water authority instead. Denied charges that North York was broke. Defeated in 1952  but later served as a councillor. Appointed to the Metro Toronto & Region Conservation Authority in the 1960s.
 1953–1956 Frederick Joseph McMahon - supported the creation of Metropolitan Toronto. Ran as the Ontario Liberal Party  candidate in York Centre in the 1955 provincial election, but was unsuccessful. A lawyer by profession, he was best known for defending bank robber Edwin Alonzo Boyd and his brother. McMahon later served as a provincial court judge.
 1957–1958 Vernon M. Singer - went on to serve as MPP from 1959 to 1977
 1959–1964 Norman C. Goodhead - as reeve, opposed illegal basement apartments and led a campaign to evict tenants. Stood for position of Metro Toronto Chairman in 1962 but lost to William Allen by four votes. Ran again for Metro Chairman in 1969, when no longer mayor, but lost to Scarborough mayor Albert Campbell.  
 1965–1966 James Ditson Service - defeated incumbent reeve Goodhead by running against Goodhead's support for amalgamating North York and the rest of Metro Toronto into a unitary city and alleging Goodhead was in a conflict of interest by owning a garbage disposal company that did business with the borough. Service campaigned on building the North York Civic Centre on Yonge Street and developing the area as a downtown with high-density office buildings. He also advocated building a  62,000 domed stadium on surplus land transferred from Downsview Airport. In private business, he co-founded CHIN Radio/TV International with Johnny Lombardi, also founding CHIN (AM) radio but later fell out with him. After he was mayor, Service became a property developer.

 1967–1969 James Ditson Service
 1970–1972 Basil H. Hall - supported the construction and extension of the Spadina Expressway and continued to do so after the provincial government cancelled the project. After he was mayor, he served on the board of the provincially owned Urban Transportation Development Corporation.
 1973–1978 Mel Lastman

 1979–1997 Mel Lastman - served as first mayor of the amalgamated city of Toronto from 1998 to 2003.

Board of Control
North York had a Board of Control from 1964 until it was abolished with the 1988 election and replaced by directly elected Metro Councillors. The Board of Control consisted of four Controllers elected at large and the mayor and served as the executive committee of North York Council. Controllers concurrently sat on Metropolitan Toronto Council

Names in  indicate Controllers that were or became Mayor of North York in other years.

X = elected as Controller
A = appointed Controller to fill a vacancy
M = sitting as Reeve or Mayor

Booth died in 1970 and was replaced by Paul Godfrey who served out the balance of his term. Godfrey was reelected in 1972, but resigned when he was elected Metro Chairman in 1973 following the death of Metro Chairman Albert Campbell. North York Council elected Alderman William Sutherland to replace Godfrey on the Board of Control on July 23, 1973.

Shiner died on 19 December 1987. Councillor Mario Gentile was appointed to the Board of Control in February 1988 to fill Shiner's seat.

Media 
 North York Mirror: A twice-weekly community newspaper covering North York. Part of Torstar's Metroland chain of community newspapers.
 Salam Toronto: Bilingual Persian-English weekly paper for the Iranian community of North York.

Recreation

Museums

North York is home to several museums including the (now closed) Canadian Air and Space Museum (formerly the Toronto Aerospace Museum) in Downsview Park. The closed museum was relocated to Edenvale, Ontario in 2019 (northwest of Barrie) and opened and renamed as the "Canadian Air and Space Conservancy". North York is also home to a number of interactive museums, including Black Creek Pioneer Village, an authentic nineteenth-century village and a living museum, the Ontario Science Centre is an interactive science museum, and the Aga Khan Museum, which includes a collection of Islamic art from the Middle-East and Northern Africa.

Sports
An aircraft manufacturing facility and a former military base are located in the Downsview neighbourhood. With the end of the Cold War, much of the land was transformed into a large park now called Downsview Park. Located within the park is the Downsview Park Sports Centre, a  multi-purpose facility built by Maple Leaf Sports & Entertainment (MLSE), owners of Toronto FC, of Major League Soccer. MLSE invested $26 million to build the Kia Training Ground, the state-of-the-art practice facility for Toronto FC. Volleyball Canada made Downsview Park its headquarters and training facility.

There are a multitude of sports clubs based in North York including the North York Storm, a girls' hockey league, Gwendolen Tennis Club, and the North York Aquatic Club, which was founded in 1958 as the North York Lions Swim Club. The Granite Club, located at Bayview and Lawrence, is an invitation-only athletic club. In 2012, the club made a major expansion in North York for their members.

The North York Ski Centre at Earl Bales Park is one of the only urban ski centres of its kind in Canada. After several incidents involving failures of the club's two-person chairlift incited talks of closing the ski centre, the city revitalized the facilities with a new four-person chairlift. Sports clubs based in North York include:

 York United FC - member of Canadian Premier League
 Toronto FC II - member of USL League One
 North York Astros – member of Canadian Soccer League
 North York Rockets – (defunct) Canadian Soccer League (1987–1992)
 North York Rangers – member of the Central Division of the Ontario Junior Hockey League
 North York Storm
 North York Aquatic Club
 North York Fire Basketball
 North York Hockey League
 North York Hearts Azzurri Soccer Club
 North York Baseball Association
 Hayabusakan Judo Club

Transportation
Several major controlled-access highways pass through North York, including Highway 400, Highway 401, Highway 404, Allen Road, and the Don Valley Parkway. The former three controlled access highways are operated by the province as 400-series highways, whereas the latter two roadways are managed by the City of Toronto. The section of Highway 401 which traverses North York is the busiest section of freeway in North America, exceeding 400,000 vehicles per day, and one of the widest.

Public transportation in North York is primarily provided by the Toronto Transit Commission's (TTC) bus or subway system. Two lines of the Toronto subway have stations in North York, the Line 1 Yonge–University, and Line 4 Sheppard. Finch station, the terminus of the Yonge Street branch of the Yonge–University line, is the busiest TTC bus station and the sixth-busiest subway station, serving around 97,460 people per day. The Line 4 Sheppard subway which runs from its intersection with the Yonge-University line at Sheppard Avenue easterly to Fairview Mall at Don Mills Road, is entirely in North York, averaging around 55,000 riders per day.  Line 5 Eglinton is a light rail line that is under construction and will traverse through the southeast portion of North York. Line 6 Finch West is another line under construction and will traverse through the northwestern portion of North York. The Ontario Line is expected to have two stops in North York, Science Centre and Flemingdon Park. The intersection of York Mills and Yonge, located next to York Mills station is home to an office and a TTC commuter parking lot, which was sold for $25 million. A $300-million project is expected to create about 300 jobs and bring a new hotel, perhaps a four star Marriott, to the intersection.

In addition to the TTC, other public transit services that may be accessed from North York include GO Transit, and York Region Transit. GO Transit provides access to commuter rail and bus services to communities throughout Greater Toronto. Both services may be accessed at GO or TTC stations located in North York.

Notable residents

 Michael Adamthwaite, voice actor
 John Bregar, actor
 Chris Campoli, professional ice hockey player
 Candi & The Backbeat, pop band
 Mel Lastman, long time Mayor of North York, and the first Mayor of the amalgamated city of Toronto
 Tie Domi, former professional ice hockey player
 James Hinchcliffe, professional auto racing driver, born here
 Adrianne Ho, model, designer, and director
 Nicholas Latifi, professional auto racing driver, grew up here
 Matt Moulson, professional ice hockey player
 Paul Godfrey, former president of the Toronto Blue Jays and former chairman of Metropolitan Toronto
 Geddy Lee, rock musician
 Louis Ferreira, actor
 Peter Polansky, tennis player
 Rambha, Indian actress, settled here
 Gary Roberts, former professional ice hockey player
 Sam Schachter, Olympic beach volleyball player
 Barry Sherman, pharmaceutical company executive and founder of Apotex.
 Snow, reggae musician

See also 

 List of neighbourhoods in North York
 Moatfield Ossuary

References

External links 
 
 
 City of Toronto: North York Community Council

 
Former cities in Ontario
Former municipalities in Toronto
Populated places established in 1922
Populated places disestablished in 1998
1922 establishments in Ontario
1998 disestablishments in Ontario
Metropolitan Toronto